Akisoferi Wesonga was an Anglican bishop in Uganda

Wesonga was educated at Buwalasi Theological College. He was ordained deacon in 1954 and priest in 1956. He served in the Upper Nile Diocese until 1961 and in Mbale from then on. He was dean of Mbale from 1963 to 1969 after which time he was the provincial secretary of the Province of Uganda. He became bishop of Mbale in 1980. He served as bishop until 1991.

References

20th-century Anglican bishops in Uganda
Anglican bishops of Mbale
Uganda Christian University alumni
Bulwalasi Theological College alumni
Anglican deans in Africa